Orange City is a city in Volusia County, Florida, United States. As of the 2010 United States Census, the city had a population of 10,599. It is a part of the Deltona–Daytona Beach–Ormond Beach metropolitan area, which was home to 590,289 people in 2010.

Geography

History
Orange City was incorporated as a city in 1882.  The city was named for the thousands of acres of orange groves in and around the city. Twelve years later, the Great Freeze wiped out the orange groves for which the town was named.

Orange City received the "highest award that the world can give" for its water at the 1904 Louisiana Purchase Exposition. John D. Rockefeller Sr. had Orange City Mineral Springs water sent to him wherever he traveled, and even used it for bathing.

Historic places
Sites on the National Register of Historic Places in Orange City include:
 Dickinson Memorial Library and Park
 Louis P. Thursby House
 Orange City Colored School
 Orange City Historic District
 Orange City Town Hall
 Seth French House
 1876 Heritage Inn

Demographics

In the census of 2000,  6,604 people, 3,062 households, and 1,904 families resided in the city. The 3,685 housing units averaged 609.0 per square mile (235.2/km). The racial makeup of the city was 92.97% White, 3.66% African American, 0.38% Native American, 0.56% Asian, 1.47% from other races, and 0.95% from two or more races. About 5.13% of the population was Hispanic or Latino of any race.

Of the 3,062 households, 19.9% had children under the age of 18 living with them, 49.3% were married couples living together, 9.8% had a female householder with no husband present, and 37.8% were not families. Around 32.4% of all households were made up of individuals, and 18.4% had someone living alone who was 65 years of age or older. The average household size was 2.12 and the average family size was 2.63.

In the city, the population was distributed as 17.5% under the age of 18, 5.8% from 18 to 24, 21.4% from 25 to 44, 24.2% from 45 to 64, and 31.1% who were 65 years of age or older. The median age was 49 years. For every 100 females, there were 86.5 males. For every 100 females age 18 and over, there were 82.9 males.

Males had a median income of $29,817 versus $21,034 for females. The per capita income for the city was $16,318. About 9.9% of the population and 7.1% of families were below the poverty line. Of the total population, 15.2% of those under the age of 18 and 7.0% of those 65 and older were living below the poverty line.

Government and infrastructure
The United States Postal Service operates a post office at 260 N Industrial Drive.

Government
The City of Orange City has a council–manager government.  The city council is composed of a mayor and six council members who serve overlapping four-year terms.  The city council serves as the elected legislative and governing body responsible for establishing policies, adopting an annual budget, adopting local laws and ordinances, and hiring and overseeing the city manager, city attorney, and municipal clerk. The mayor and council members are elected by voters citywide and must reside within the corporate limits of Orange City. Council members run for office by district (five) and one at-large.

Fire department
The Orange City Fire Department, established in 1890, is a combination department (volunteer and paid). The department consists of two fire stations; station 67, located at 215 N. Holly Ave, is also the main station where administration is housed. Station 68 is located at the south-end water plant. This is a secured facility and not accessible for the public. The department was recently awarded a class 2 ISO rating, first and only in Volusia County. The Orange City Fire Department is contracted to provide fire services to the City of DeBary, Florida (Station 33). All engines and the Rescue are ALS supplied and staffed with paramedics.

Public transportation
  Interstate 4
  State Road 472

Orange City is served by the #20, #21, #22, & #23 routes operated by Volusia County Public Transit System.

Education

Elementary schools
 Manatee Cove Elementary School
 Orange City Elementary School

Middle schools
 River Springs Middle School

High schools
 University High School

Notable people

 Herbert L. Becker, magician who performed under the name Kardeen
 Harry W. Davis, a former mayor of Orange City, killed himself on February 14, 1932, following financial troubles just two months after his marriage, at age 27
 Gaylord DuBois, author of the novel The Lone Ranger
 Danny Kelley, American stock-car racing driver
 Tom Laputka, former football player for Ottawa Rough Riders and Edmonton Eskimos,  former mayor of Orange City
 Gar Samuelson, former drummer for heavy metal band Megadeth

References

External links

 City of Orange City official website

 
Cities in Florida
Cities in Volusia County, Florida
Greater Orlando
Populated places on the St. Johns River